The Playboy Winner's Guide to Board Games is a 1979 book by Jon Freeman. It is a revised edition of A Player's Guide to Table Games by the same author, but under the name John Jackson.

Contents
The Playboy Winner's Guide to Board Games is a book of tips on strategies for winning board games.  There are 11 chapters; the first seven cover various sorts of board games, the last chapter is a discussion of role-playing games. This book is one of a few that covered a large number of proprietary board games, rather than just traditional board games.

Reception
Steve Jackson reviewed The Playboy Winner's Guide to Board Games in The Space Gamer No. 44. Jackson commented that "This is a definite 'go' if you don't confine yourself to wargames. The more restricted the spectrum of games you play, the less likely it is you'll find it worthwhile. Conversely, if you play everything you can find, you'll like the book."

Reviews
Games

References

1979 non-fiction books
Books about board games
English-language books